The Criminal of the Century is a 1928 German silent crime film directed by Max Obal and starring Luciano Albertini, Gritta Ley, and Hans Albers. It was shot at the Staaken Studios in Berlin. The film's art direction was by Jacek Rotmil.

Cast

References

Bibliography

External links

1928 films
Films of the Weimar Republic
German silent feature films
Films directed by Max Obal
1928 crime films
German crime films
Films based on German novels
German black-and-white films
1920s German films
Films shot at Staaken Studios